CCGS Cap Percé is one of the Canadian Coast Guard's 36 s.
She was scheduled to be stationed at a new Coast Guard station in Kegaska, Quebec, on the Gulf of St Lawrence.
Like her sister ships she will be staffed by a crew of four, two of whom will be search and rescue technicians.

According to Gail Shea, Minister of Fisheries and Oceans Canada: "Given the intensive commercial fishing activities and the pleasure boat and ship traffic that characterize the area, Kegaska is a strategic location for a Canadian Coast Guard lifeboat station. Furthermore, this will allow us to consolidate our coverage in this critical sector of the Gulf of St. Lawrence."

Design
It contains two computer-operated Detroit DDEC-III 6V-92TA diesel engines providing a combined . It has two  four-blade propellers, and its complement is four crew members and five passengers.

Communication options include Raytheon 152 HF-SSB and Motorola Spectra 9000 VHF50W radios, and a Raytheon RAY 430 loudhailer system. The boat also supports the Simrad TD-L1550 VHF-FM radio direction finder. Raytheon provides a number of other electronic systems for the lifeboat, including the RAYCHART 620, the ST 30 heading indicator and ST 50 depth indicator, the NAV 398 global positioning system, a RAYPILOT 650 autopilot system, and either the R41X AN or SPS-69 radar systems.

References

Cape-class motor lifeboats
2009 ships
Ships built in British Columbia
Ships of the Canadian Coast Guard